Parliamentary elections were held in the United Arab Emirates on 24 September 2011 to elect the half of the members of Federal National Council. The elections were held using electoral colleges, which were expanded from around 6,000 members in the 2006 elections to 129,274. However, only 35,877 voters voted, with a voter turnout of 28%.

Electoral college
The 2011 parliamentary elections had an expanded electoral college constituting 129,274 members, made up of 46% females and 54% males, of which 35% were younger than 30 years.

Candidates
Nominations of candidates took place between 14 and 17 August. On 20 August 2011, the National Elections Commission announced the preliminary list of candidates, stating that 469 members of the electoral college nominated themselves to be candidates to run for the parliamentary elections. Of those 469 nominees, 85 were women.

After last-minute applications were taken into account, the final list included 477 candidates.

Campaign
The campaign period lasted from 4 to 21 September 2011. Some observers called for a delay in the voting process to allow for more time for candidates to campaign.  

Candidates were prohibited from using religion in their campaign, and were limited to spend 2 million dirhams.

Results

Turnout by emirate

Nominated members
The appointed members announced were:
Abu Dhabi:
Noura al-Kaabi
Sultan al-Daheri
Khalifa al-Suwaidi
Amal Al Qubaisi

Dubai:
Afra al-Basti
Mona al-Bahar
Mohammad Al-Murr
Ahmad al-Mansouri

Sharjah:
Shaikha al-Owais
Ahmad al-Za'abi
Ya'aqoub al-Naqbi

Ras Al Khaimah:
Abdul al-Za'abi
Rashid al-Shuraiqi
Abdul al-Shaheen

Ajman:
Ahmad al-Shamsi
Ali al-Nuaimi

Fujairah:
Mohammad al-Raqabani
Aisha al-Yamahi

Umm Al Quwain:
Ali Ahmad
Humaid Ali

Aftermath
Mohammed Al-Murr was elected unopposed as Speaker of the Federal National Council.

References

Elections in the United Arab Emirates
United Arab Emirates
Parliamentary election
United Arab Emirates